Arfaoui is an Arabic surname of North African origin. It is most commonly used in Tunisia.

Ahlem Arfaoui Tartir (born 1961), Tunisian academic
Fedi Arfaoui (born 1992), Tunisian football player
Latifa Bint Alaya El Arfaoui (born 1961), Tunisian singer
Rached Arfaoui (born 1996), Tunisian football player

Arabic-language surnames